Shanae Davison is an Australian rules footballer. She was selected by the West Coast Eagles with pick number 18 in the 2020 AFL Women's draft, and made her AFL Women's debut in round 1 of the 2021 season.

Early life
Davison was born in Perth, Western Australia on 18 August 2001, but moved to Broome, in the state's north, at a young age. She lived there for 10 years, throughout all of primary school, before moving back to Perth for high school. At first, she played basketball, but she started playing football at the Noranda Hawks in 2018. Growing up, she was a  supporter.

Football career
In 2019, she started playing for the Swan Districts WAFLW team. That year, during a match against Claremont, she took a spectacular mark, which was a contender for WAFLW Mark of the Year.

Davison was selected by the West Coast Eagles with pick number 18 in the 2020 AFL Women's draft. She was one of six West Coast Eagles AFLW players to debut for the first round of the 2021 season, on 30 January. She played a further four matches that season before injuring her hamstring.

References

2001 births
Living people
West Coast Eagles (AFLW) players
Swan Districts Football Club players
Australian rules footballers from Western Australia
People from Broome, Western Australia